Edwin Eayrs (November 10, 1890 – November 30, 1969) was an American Major League Baseball player who played outfield from 1913 to 1921. He attended Brown University and also pitched during his career.

References

External links

1890 births
1969 deaths
Major League Baseball outfielders
Major League Baseball pitchers
Boston Braves players
Brooklyn Robins players
Pittsburgh Pirates players
Brown Bears baseball coaches
Minor league baseball managers
Columbus Senators players
New Haven Indians players
New Haven Profs players
Providence Grays (minor league) players
Toronto Maple Leafs (International League) players
Providence Rubes players
Worcester Panthers players
People from Blackstone, Massachusetts
Baseball players from Massachusetts
Sportspeople from Worcester County, Massachusetts